Amis du Basket-Ball Contern is a professional basketball club from Contern, Luxembourg. The men's team plays in the Total League and their home venue is Ancien Hall Sportif Contern. The club was established in 1956.

Honours 
Luxembourgian League
 Winners (4): 1987–88, 2000–01, 2003–04, 2008–09
Luxembourg Cup
 Winners (3): 1986–87, 1989–90, 1995–96

References

External links 
 AB Contern official website

Basketball teams established in 1956
Basketball teams in Luxembourg